Limnaecia acontophora is a moth of the family Cosmopterigidae. It is known from Philippines (Luzon).

References

Limnaecia
Moths described in 1922
Moths of Asia
Taxa named by Edward Meyrick